Pietro Diana (28 December 1931 – 12 October 2016) was an Italian printer, engraver, and designer, as well as a creator of "automates".

Bibliography
 Giorgio Auneddu, Pietro Diana: incisioni, disegni, automates (opere recenti 1975–1991), Torino, Tuttagrafica, 1991

References

External links
 Pietro Diana. Gli ottant’anni di un maestro dell’incisione – Luca Pietro Nicoletti

1931 births
2016 deaths
20th-century Italian painters
Italian male painters
21st-century Italian painters
20th-century Italian male artists
21st-century Italian male artists